The Victorian Polo Club is a polo club in Richmond, Victoria, Australia. It is the oldest and largest polo club in Victoria.

References

External links

Sporting clubs in Melbourne
1990 establishments in Australia
Sports clubs established in 1990
Polo clubs in Australia